The 2015 American Athletic Conference football season is the 25th NCAA Division I FBS football season of the American Athletic Conference (The American). The season is the third since the breakup of the former Big East Conference, and the second season with the new College Football Playoff in place. Under the playoff system, The American is no longer an Automatic Qualifying conference (AQ), and is considered a member of the "Group of Five" (G5) with Conference USA, the Mid-American Conference, Mountain West Conference, and the Sun Belt Conference. Whereas under the previous system the champion of the conference was guaranteed an automatic berth to a BCS bowl game, now the highest-ranked member of the G5 will receive a bid to one of the six major bowls.

The American consists of 12 members: Cincinnati, East Carolina,  Houston, Memphis, SMU, South Florida, Temple, Tulane, Tulsa, UCF, UConn, and new member Navy. In June 2015, the Collegiate Commissioner's Association announced that it will postpone final rankings until after the annual Army–Navy Game if Navy or Army are in contention for a spot in the semifinals or a New Years Six bowl. If Navy is the highest-ranked Group of 5 champion and loses to Army, it would be replaced by next highest-ranked Group of 5 champion in the New Years Six Bowl.

Previous season
Memphis, Cincinnati, and UCF were declared co-champions for the 2014 season, with each team having a conference record of 7–1. Memphis finished the season ranked 25th after defeating BYU 55–48 in 2OT in the Miami Beach Bowl. UCF was defeated by NC State in the St. Petersburg Bowl, and Virginia Tech defeated Cincinnati in the Military Bowl. With less than 11 minutes left on the game clock in the Armed Forces Bowl, Houston trailed Pittsburgh by 25 points, but the Cougars went on to win by a score of 35–34. It was the biggest fourth quarter comeback in bowl history. Florida defeated East Carolina 28–20 in the Birmingham Bowl.

American Athletic Conference Media Day
The 2015 American Athletic Conference Media Day was held at the Hyatt Regency Newport in Newport, Rhode Island on August 3, 2015.

Preseason poll

East Division
 Cincinnati (29) 179
 UCF         (1) 135
 Temple          116 
 East Carolina   105
 South Florida    53
 Connecticut      42

West Division
 Memphis (13) 153
 Houston (10) 149
 Navy (7) 148
 Tulane 74
 SMU 59
 Tulsa 47
(First-Place Votes)          Points

Predicted American Championship Game Winner
 Cincinnati 22
 Memphis     5
 Houston     2
 UCF         1 
 Points

Head coaches

East Division
 Tommy Tuberville, Cincinnati – 3rd year
 Bob Diaco, Connecticut – 2nd year
 Ruffin McNeill, East Carolina – 5th year
 Willie Taggart, South Florida – 3rd year
 Matt Rhule, Temple – 3rd year
 George O'Leary (resigned after 8 games) / Danny Barrett (interim)*,UCF

West Division
 Tom Herman, Houston – 1st year
 Justin Fuente, Memphis – 4th year
 Ken Niumatalolo, Navy – 13th year
 Chad Morris, SMU – 1st year
 Curtis Johnson, Tulane – 4th year
 Philip Montgomery, Tulsa – 1st year

Coaching changes

Changes after 2014 season
* On December 1, 2014, Chad Morris (formerly Offensive Coordinator at Clemson) was hired by SMU as its new head football coach, replacing June Jones, who resigned on September 8, 2014, citing "personal issues".

* On December 11, 2014, Philip Montgomery (previously Offensive Coordinator at Baylor) was hired by Tulsa as its new head football coach, replacing Bill Blankenship, who was fired December 2, 2014.

* On December 15, 2014, Tom Herman (formerly Offensive Coordinator at Ohio State) was hired by Houston as its new head football coach, to replace Tony Levine, who was fired after three seasons on December 8, 2014.

Changes during 2015 season
* George O'Leary resigned as UCF's head football coach after twelve seasons. Quarterbacks coach Danny Barrett was named interim head coach for the remainder of the season.

Rankings

Schedule

Week 1

Week 2

Week 3

Week 4

Week 5

Week 6

Week 7

Week 8

Week 9

Week 10

Week 11

Week 12

Week 13

The American Championship

Week 15

Rankings are from AP Poll.  All times Eastern Time Zone.

Bowl games

(Rankings from final CFP Poll; All times Eastern)

Selection of teams
Bowl eligible
Cincinnati, Connecticut, Houston, Memphis, Navy, South Florida, Temple, Tulsa
Bowl-ineligible
East Carolina, SMU, Tulane, UCF

Records against FBS conferences
2015 records against FBS conferences:

The American vs. Power Conferences

‡This game was played at a neutral site.

Players of the Week

Awards and honors

Conference awards
The following individuals received postseason honors as voted by the American Athletic Conference football coaches at the end of the season

NFL Draft
The following list includes all AAC players who were drafted in the 2016 NFL draft.

Attendance

 Games highlighted in green were sell-outs.

References